Yvan Martel (born January 5, 1970) is a French mathematician.

Education and career
Martel matriculated in 1989 at the École Polytechnique and graduated there in 1992 with an undergraduate degree and in 1993 with a Diplôme d'études approfondies (DEA) in nonlinear analysis and numerical analysis. At Pierre and Marie Curie University (Paris 6) he graduated in 1996 with  Thèse de Doctorat (PhD) under the supervision of Thierry Cazenave. At the Cergy-Pontoise University, Martel habilitated in 2000 with advisor Jean Ginibre.

Martel's research deals with partial differential equations from mathematical physics, especially solitons. He has collaborated extensively with Frank Merle.

Martel was a Maître de conférences at Cergy-Pontoise University from 1997 to 2004, on leave at École Polytechnique as a full-time associate professor (Professeur chargé de cours à temps complet) from 2002 to 2004. From 2004 to 2012 he was a part-time associate professor (Professeur chargé de cours à temps incomplet) at École Polytechnique and a professor at Versailles Saint-Quentin-en-Yvelines University. He was the director of the laboratoire de mathématiques de Versailles (UVSQ/CNRS UMR8100) from 2008 to 2012 and the director of the Centre de mathématiques Laurent-Schwartz (CMLS) from 2012 to 2017. Since 2012 he is a professor at École Polytechnique at CMLS.

In 2008 Martel was an invited speaker at the European Congress of Mathematics in Amsterdam. From 2008 to 2012, he was a junior member of the Institut Universitaire de France. In 2011 he gave a one-hour lecture at the Rivière-Fabes symposium in Minneapolis. In 2018 he was an invited speaker at the International Congress of Mathematicians in Rio de Janeiro.

Selected publications

References

External links
 Yvan Martel, CNRS home page

1970 births
Living people
20th-century French mathematicians
21st-century French mathematicians
École Polytechnique alumni
Pierre and Marie Curie University alumni
Academic staff of École Polytechnique
Academic staff of Versailles Saint-Quentin-en-Yvelines University